Underwater Rugby started in the United States in 1979.

History
Nick Caloyianis started the first team at Catonsville Community College (now called Community College of Baltimore County, Catonsville). He is a famous underwater filmmaker and director, with several televised specials. Catonsville Community College is just south of the Baltimore Beltway, and south of the city limits. Anne Arundel Community College had a competing team for several years. It was also played for a while at the YMCA pool in Severna Park, Arundel Olympic Swim Center pool in Annapolis, and briefly in a pool in Columbia and at Howard Community College. There weren't any players from Colombia, S. America for several years after the start of UW Rugby in the USA, although they did participate in the 1990s and had players on the men's team at 1999  and 2003 worlds and women's team at 2003 worlds. Voting representatives for the international CMAS rules changes were sent to the CMAS 1987 Underwater Rugby Worlds in Zurich, Switzerland, and to the worlds in 1991 in Copenhagen, Denmark. Boston started a team a couple of years later than Baltimore and Boston still plays both Underwater Rugby and more recently underwater hockey.

Around the year 2000, UW Rugby events in the US were basically UWR Clinics on which players from different parts of the country met to play during a weekend and play on a potluck format. After fail attempts to put together a National team to go to the World Championships of 2007 in Italy and 2011 in Finland, the only active clubs in the US (East Haven Makos, New Jersey Hammerheads, and Boston Narwhals) decided to join efforts with their Canadian counterparts (CAMO, Club Liberation) and started a Local Competition called the North American Underwater Rugby Tournaments (NAT) to raise the level of the game in both countries as well as provide continuous competition throughout the years for both countries.

With the North American Tournaments (NAT) the competition and level of play started to grow the sport and additional teams began to appear and expand the NAT tournaments. New Clubs started in the DC area, Florida, and later Wisconsin and California.

NAT tournaments also became attractive to clubs from other countries and participation especially from Colombian Clubs has been an additional motivation for local clubs.

USA clubs

International competition
The USA National Team has only been involved 4 times in CMAS world tournaments as described below.

1999 CMAS World Championship - Essen Germany
A combined team of players from Baltimore, Boston, and some Colombian immigrants went to the Worlds in 1999 in Germany 

2003 CMAS World Championship - Fredericia Denmark
The team for the 2003 World Championship was assembled with players from different states with a base pool set in Massachusetts
and in 2003 to Fredericia, Denmark. A combined women's team also went to Worlds in 2003.

2015 CMAS World Championship - Cali Colombia
The teams for the 2015 World Championships was assembled with players from different states including MA, NJ, CT, FL, DC

2019 CMAS World Championship - Graz Austria
The teams for the 2019 World Championships was assembled with players from different states including MA, NJ, CT, FL, DC, CA, TX

<ref>Results from the 1999 Underwater Rugby World Cup. "". International Underwater Rugby Commission

Local competition
The North American Underwater Rugby Tournaments (NAT) started in 2011 as a competition of US and Canadian Clubs with the purpose of providing local and continuous competition throughout the year in an effort to grow the sport and improve the level of play In both countries

References

External links
 Underwater Society of America Underwater Rugby homepage
 USA Underwater Rugby homepage

Underwater rugby
Underwater sport in the United States